The International Classification of Sleep Disorders (ICSD) is "a primary diagnostic, epidemiological and coding resource for clinicians and researchers in the field of sleep and sleep medicine". The ICSD was produced by the American Academy of Sleep Medicine (AASM) in association with the European Sleep Research Society, the Japanese Society of Sleep Research, and the Latin American Sleep Society. The classification was developed as a revision and update of the Diagnostic Classification of Sleep and Arousal Disorders (DCSAD) that was produced by both the Association of Sleep Disorders Centers (ASDC) and the Association for the Psychophysiological Study of Sleep and was published in the journal Sleep in 1979. A second edition, called ICSD-2, was published by the AASM in 2005.  The third edition, ICSD-3, was released by the AASM in 2014.

Milestones of sleep disorder classifications

Introduction 

In 1979, the first Diagnostic Classification of Sleep and Arousal Disorders (DCSAD) was developed by the Association of Sleep Disorders Centers (ASDC) and the Association for the Psychophysiological Study of Sleep. Disorders were divided into four main categories. 
 Disorders of initiating and maintaining sleep (DIMS) – Insomnias
 Disorders of Excessive somnolence (DOES) – Hypersomnias
 Disorders of the Sleep-Wake Schedule – Circadian Disorders
 Dysfunctions Associated with Sleep, Sleep Stages, or Partial Arousals – Parasomnias

In 1990, the first comprehensive classification of disorders of sleep and arousal, the International Classification of Sleep Disorders (ICSD-1990), was developed by the American Academy of Sleep Medicine (AASM) in association with the European Sleep Research Society, the Japanese Society of Sleep Research, and the Latin American Sleep Society. 84 sleep disorders were inventoried, based on pathophysiological characteristics. It was later revised as the ICSD-R in 1997. 

The International Classification of Sleep Disorders (ICSD) uses a multiaxial system for stating and coding diagnoses both in clinical reports or for database purposes. The axial system uses International Classification of Diseases (ICD-9-CM) coding wherever possible. Additional codes are included for procedures and physical signs of particular interest to sleep disorders clinicians and researchers. Diagnoses and procedures are listed and coded on three main "axes". The axial system is arranged as follows:

Axis A ICSD Classification of Sleep Disorders

Axis B ICD-9-CM Classification of Procedures

Axis C ICD-9-CM Classification of Diseases (nonsleep diagnoses).

ICSD - I (1990) and ICSD-Revised (1997) 

 Dyssomnias
 Intrinsic Sleep Disorders
 Extrinsic Sleep Disorders
 Circadian Rhythm Sleep Disorders
 Parasomnias
 Arousal Disorders
 Sleep-Wake Transition Disorders
 Parasomnias Usually Associated with REM Sleep
 Other Parasomnias
 Sleep Disorders Associated with Mental, Neurologic, or Other Medical Disorders
 Associated with Mental Disorders
 Associated with Neurologic Disorders
 Associated with Other Medical Disorders
 Proposed Sleep Disorders
 Shorter Sleeper
 Long Sleeper
 Menstrual-Associated Sleep Disorders

ICSD-2 

In 2005, the International Classification of Sleep Disorders underwent minor updates and modifications resulting in version 2 (ICSD-2).

The ICSD-2 thus lists 81 sleep disorder diagnostic categories divided in 8 major categories. Each diagnostic is detailed in a description that presents the diagnostic criteria. The 81 diagnostics are divided into 8 main categories, namely insomnias, sleep-related breathing disorders, hypersomnias of central origin, circadian rhythm sleep disorders, parasomnias, sleep-related movement disorders, isolated symptoms apparently normal variants and unresolved issues, other sleep disorders. The two last categories (i.e. sleep disorders associated with disorders classified elsewhere and psychiatric disorders frequently encountered in the differential diagnosis of sleep disorders) are presented in the appendices and count 13 diagnostics.

In 2006, a pocket version of the ICSD-2 was released. In this version, a pediatric section was added listing the following diagnostic categories: 
 Behavioural Insomnia in Childhood
 Onset Type
 Limit Setting Type
 Primary Sleep Apnea of Infancy
 Obstructive Sleep Apnea, Pediatric
 Congenital Central Alveolar Hypoventilation Syndrome
 Sleep Enuresis
 Restless Legs Syndrome
 Sleep-related Rhythmic Movement Disorder

However, this classification brought some confusion into the field, which led to the revision of the classification in 2011. The classification was much more discussed by experts of the field and led to the third edition of the ICSD.

ICSD-3 (2014) 

The revision of the ICSD-2 was firstly made by the AASM and other International Societies. This revision integrates pediatric diagnosis into clinical adult diagnosis (except for obstructive sleep apnea) and led to the third edition of the ICSD, which was released in 2014. 

ICSD-3 includes specific diagnoses within the seven major categories, as well as an appendix for classification of sleep disorders associated with medical and neurologic disorders. The International Classification of Diseases (ICD-9-CM and ICD-10-CM) codes corresponding to each specific diagnosis can be found within the ICSD-3. Furthermore, pediatric diagnoses are not distinguished from adult diagnoses except for sleep-related breathing disorders.

In addition, significant changes have been made in the nosology of insomnia, narcolepsy and parasomnia. Primary vs. secondary (i.e. comorbid) insomnia has been reunited into a single disorder: chronic insomnia. Narcolepsy has been divided into narcolepsy Type 1 and narcolepsy Type 2. These two types are distinguished by the presence or absence of cataplexy and the cerebrospinal fluid hypocretin-1 level. Concerning parasomnia, the sections have been modified, grouping together common features. Finally, a section on treatment-emerging CSA has been added to the CSA syndromes section.

It also discusses common isolated symptoms and normal variants. Some occur during normal sleep: as an example, sleep talking occurs at some time in most normal sleepers. Some lie on the continuum between normal and abnormal: as an example, snoring without associated airway compromise, sleep disturbance, or other consequences is essentially normal, whereas heavy snoring is often part of obstructive sleep apnea.

Furthermore, some features are no longer disorders and are reunited in the AASM [American Academy of Sleep Medicine] Manual for the Scoring of Sleep and Associated Events. Therefore, ICSD permanently refers to this manual. The latter allows, for instance, to find definitions of polysomnography or specific features.

The ICSD-3 counts 383 pages for 83 disorders. It is divided into 7 main categories:

1. Insomnia
 Chronic insomnia disorder
 Short-term insomnia disorder
 Other insomnia (when the patient has insomnia symptoms but does not meet criteria for the other two types of insomnia)

Isolated symptoms and normal variants

2. Sleep-related breathing disorders

Obstructive sleep apnea (OSA) syndromes 
 OSA, adult
 OSA, pediatric

Central sleep apnea syndromes 
 Central sleep apnea with Cheyne-Stokes breathing
 Central sleep apnea due a medical disorder without Cheyne-Stokes breathing
 Central sleep apnea due to high altitude periodic breathing
 Central sleep apnea due to a medication or substance
 Primary central sleep apnea
 Primary central sleep apnea of infancy
 Primary central sleep apnea of prematurity
 Treatment-emergent central sleep apnea

Sleep-related hypoventilation disorders 
 Obesity hypoventilation syndrome
 Congenital central alveolar hypoventilation syndrome
 Late-onset central hypoventilation with hypothalamic dysfunction
 Idiopathic central alveolar hypoventilation
 Sleep-related hypoventilation due to a medication or substance
 Sleep-related hypoventilation due to a medical disorder

Sleep-related hypoxemia disorder

Isolated symptoms and normal variants 
 Snoring
 Catathrenia

3. Central disorders of hypersomnolence 
 Narcolepsy type 1
 Narcolepsy type 2
 Idiopathic hypersomnia
 Kleine-Levin syndrome
 Hypersomnia due to a medical disorder
 Hypersomnia due to a medication or substance
 Hypersomnia associated with a psychiatric disorder
 Insufficient sleep syndrome

4. Circadian rhythm sleep-wake disorders 
 Delayed sleep-wake phase disorder
 Advanced sleep-wake phase disorder
 Irregular sleep-wake rhythm disorder
 Non-24-hour sleep-wake rhythm disorder
 Shift work disorder
 Jet lag disorder
 Circadian sleep-wake disorder not otherwise specified

5. Parasomnias

NREM-related parasomnias 
Confusional arousals
Sleepwalking
Sleep terrors
 Sleep-related eating disorder

REM-related parasomnias 
 REM sleep behavior disorder
 Recurrent isolated sleep paralysis
 Nightmare disorder

Other parasomnias 
 Exploding head syndrome
 Sleep-related hallucinations
 Sleep enuresis
 Parasomnia due to a medical disorder
 Parasomnia due to a medication or substance
 Parasomnia, unspecified

Isolated symptoms and normal variants 
 Sleep talking

6. Sleep-related movement disorders 
 Restless legs syndrome
 Periodic limb movement disorder
 Sleep-related leg cramps
 Sleep-related bruxism
 Sleep-related rhythmic movement disorder
 Benign sleep myoclonus of infancy
 Propriospinal myoclonus at sleep onset
 Sleep-related movement disorder due to a medical disorder
 Sleep-related movement disorder due to a medication or substance
 Sleep-related movement disorder, unspecified

Isolated symptoms and normal variants 
Excessive fragmentary myoclonus
Hypnagogic foot tremor and alternating leg muscle activation
Sleep starts (hypnic jerks)

7. Other sleep disorders 
Other sleep-related symptoms or events that do not meet the standard definition of a sleep disorder

See also

References

External links 

International Classification of Diseases
Sleep disorders